Rebecca Medel  (b. 1947, Denver, Colorado) is an American artist known for sculptural fiber art. She attended Arizona State University and the University of California, Los Angeles. In 2010 she became Fellow of the American Craft Council. Her work is in the Art Institute of Chicago, the Fine Arts Museums of San Francisco, the Museum of Design Zurich, and the Philadelphia Museum of Art. Her work, Framed Light, was acquired by the Smithsonian American Art Museum as part of the Renwick Gallery's 50th Anniversary Campaign.

References

1947 births
Living people
Artists from Denver
20th-century textile artists
20th-century women textile artists
20th-century American artists
20th-century American women artists
21st-century textile artists
21st-century women textile artists
21st-century American artists
21st-century American women artists
Arizona State University alumni
University of California, Los Angeles alumni
Fellows of the American Craft Council